Christopher Michael Ellison (born 16 December 1946 in St Pancras, London) is an English actor. He is best known for his role as DCI Frank Burnside in the ITV police series The Bill and short-lived spin-off series Burnside.

Education
At school his art teacher encouraged him having seen his talent. Art remained his strong subject throughout his school years, and it was a natural progression that Ellison then moved on to art college, firstly at Wimbledon and then Camberwell.

Career
He worked in the merchant navy, trained as a graphic designer and worked as a minicab driver. His first drama job was assistant stage manager at the Richmond Theatre. His first acting role was in the play Woman in a Dressing Gown at said theatre. His first major guest role was an appearance in The Sweeney (1975).

He appeared in many guest roles in TV shows throughout the 1970s, including episodes of The Professionals, Dempsey and Makepeace and Bergerac and in the films Rosie Dixon - Night Nurse (1978), Lady Oscar (1979), Brush Strokes and Buster (1988), based on the Great Train Robbery of 1963. In 1981 he had a notable role as bent DI in the ITV crime mini-series Wolcott, a performance with marked similarities to his later work in The Bill

In 1984, he appeared in Paul McCartney's feature film Give My Regards To Broad Street playing Rath's Minder. In 1986, he played criminal gang leader Charlie Elkin in Running Scared, based on Bernard Ashley's novel.

Having first appeared as Detective Sergeant Tommy Burnside in 1984, he became a regular cast member of The Bill from 1988 to 1993 now with the name Frank Burnside appearing as Detective Inspector. After an absence of five years, Burnside returned on a semi-regular basis from 1998 to 2000 having been promoted to the rank of Detective Chief Inspector during the interim.

He appeared in one episode of the sci-fi police series, Crime Traveller, in 1997.

Although best known for playing tough guys, he also played George, a transvestite, in the radio series The Change from 2001 to 2004.

2003–2010
In 2003, Ellison played the lead role in the revived series of Fort Boyard, which aired on Challenge. In 2005, he guest starred in the Doctor Who audio adventure The Game. In 2007, Ellison played the role of Len Harker in the BBC One soap opera, EastEnders.

He has appeared in Casualty, Judge John Deed,  and Minder, among other appearances on Soccer AM, and presenting roles in The World's Most Stupid Criminals and Mousetrapped.

In February 2009, Ellison won Celebrity Come Dine with Me on Channel 4. In 2009, he appeared in the film A Silent Whistle and in 2010 Bonded by Blood and Basement.

2011–present
In August 2011, he appeared in a New Tricks episode titled 'Half Life' as a prisoner. On 27 August 2015, he entered the Celebrity Big Brother house. He was evicted on 8 September 2015.

In 2017 he appeared on the celebrity version of the television game show Pointless.

Personal life

Books
In 1989, Ellison illustrated the children's books Otto and the Sea Circus, written by his future The Bill co-star Tom Cotcher.

In 2020, Ellison shared his memories of his early work on The Bill for the book Witness Statements: Making The Bill (Series 1-3). A follow-up volume, Witness Statements: Making The Bill (1988) was published in 2022, also featuring memories from Ellison about his time as Frank Burnside during the earliest half-hour episodes of the programme.

Aphasia diagnosis
In April 2022, Ellison revealed that he had been suffering from aphasia for about 18 months. Ellison's decision to publicly disclose his condition was inspired by American actor Bruce Willis's announcement that he too had the condition.

Ellison had been diagnosed with the condition following a stroke in mid-2020 when his wife discovered him lying on their bedroom floor at their home in Brighton.  He had to be removed via a skylight due to the ambulance crew not being able to move him down a spiral staircase. Ellison was moved to a rehabilitation centre in Haywards Heath.

When Ellison returned home in November 2020, his wife became his full-time carer but she credits their two adult children and Ellison's former castmate Mark Wingett for providing valuable support.  Due to his condition hampering his ability to communicate, Ellison became anxious when leaving the house due to the fear of being recognised and not being able to engage in conversation.  Despite having difficulty speaking, Ellison can fully understand what others are saying.

Despite initially being reluctant to publicise his diagnosis, Ellison and his wife hope that by sharing their experience with aphasia it will enable other people to develop an awareness and understanding of the condition.

Filmography

Film

Television

References

External links

1946 births
Living people
English male television actors
English male stage actors
English male film actors
People from St Pancras, London
Male actors from London